Data theft is a growing phenomenon primarily caused by system administrators and office workers with access to technology such as database servers, desktop computers and a growing list of hand-held devices capable of storing digital information, such as USB flash drives, iPods and even digital cameras. Since employees often spend a considerable amount of time developing contacts, confidential, and copyrighted information for the company they work for, they may feel they have some right to the information and are inclined to copy and/or delete part of it when they leave the company, or misuse it while they are still in employment. Information can be sold and bought and then used by criminals and criminal organizations. Alternatively, an employee may choose to deliberately abuse trusted access to information for the purpose of exposing misconduct by the employer. From the perspective of the society, such an act of whistleblowing can be seen as positive and is protected by law in certain situations in some jurisdictions, such as the USA.

A common scenario is where a sales person makes a copy of the contact database for use in their next job. Typically, this is a clear violation of their terms of employment.

Notable acts of data theft include those by leaker Chelsea Manning and self-proclaimed whistleblowers Edward Snowden and Hervé Falciani.

Data theft methods

Thumbsucking
Thumbsucking, similar to podslurping, is the intentional or undeliberate use of a portable USB mass storage device, such as a USB flash drive (or "thumbdrive"), to illicitly download confidential data from a network endpoint.

A USB flash drive was allegedly used to remove without authorization highly classified documents about the design of U.S. nuclear weapons from a vault at Los Alamos.

The threat of thumbsucking has been amplified for a number of reasons, including the following:
The storage capacity of portable USB storage devices has increased.
The cost of high-capacity portable USB storage devices has decreased.
Networks have grown more dispersed, the number of remote network access points has increased and methods of network connection have expanded, increasing the number of vectors for network infiltration.

Data Leakage 
Data leak is part of insider attack that accidental or unintentional data loss because of specific circuit stances.

Investigating data theft
Techniques to investigate data theft include stochastic forensics, digital artifact analysis (especially of USB drive artifacts), and other computer forensics techniques.

See also
Pod slurping
Bluesnarfing
Sneakernet
Data breach

References

External links 
USBs' Giant Sucking Sound
Readers Weigh In: Is the IPod a Threat or a Scapegoat?
Online Behaviours that can Lead to Data Theft

Data security
Theft
Data laws